Katarina Löfström (born 1970 Falun, Sweden) is a Swedish artist. She attended the University College of Arts, Crafts and Design in Stockholm. Her work consists of computer-animated videos. She is best known for the short films "Hang Ten Sunset" (2000) and "Whiteout" (2001).

Notable works

 An Island (2004)
 Score (2004)
 State (2003)
 Pan A.M. (2002)
 Red Light (2002)
 Whiteout (2001)
 Hang Ten Sunset (2000)

References

External links

1970 births
Living people
20th-century Swedish women artists
20th-century Swedish artists
21st-century Swedish women artists
21st-century Swedish artists
Swedish contemporary artists
Swedish video artists
Swedish animators
Swedish animated film directors
Swedish women animators